Church of All Saints is a  Grade I listed church in Houghton Conquest, Bedfordshire, England. It became a listed building on 23 January 1961. The parish church, dedicated to All Saints, was built during the 14th century. There are also several monuments. Houghton Conquest's rectory was united with that of Houghton-Gildable in 1637, in the archdeaconry of Bedford, and diocese of Lincoln.  It was under the patronage of the Master and Fellows of St John's College, Cambridge.

On 4 October 2018 it was reported that the entire lead roof had been stolen.

Architecture and fittings
The church is spacious, built in the Early English Period and Decorated styles.  It consists of chancel, nave, aisles, south porch, and an embattled tower containing six bells.  It was repaired in 1845.  The stained glass east window, erected in 1880 by John William Burgon, Dean of Chichester, is a memorial to three benefactors. Built in 1830, some of the walls bear traces of frescoes, the designs of which are in some parts sufficiently distinct to be distinguished.  Over the north doorway is a huge painting of St Christopher, of the 15th century.  On the north walls of the chancel, there is a monument of carved alabaster.  There is also an altar slab from 1644, as well as a few mutilated brasses. The register dates from the year 1595.

Rectors
The following rectors are named in The History of All Saints Church Houghton Conquest, by G. P. K. Winlaw, and other sources as cited:
 before 1285: William de Lubenham
 1285: Geoffrey Conquest
 1303: Robert de Suddebrok
 1306: Robert de Morecore
 1312: John de la Bourne
 1323: John Speling of Kerdington
 1323: Simon de Northwode
 1331: William de Gayton
 1337: William Conquest
 1337: John Conquest
 1349: Henry Balle of Aldwyncle
 1366: Geoffrey Burgh
 1399: John Drugge of Kerdington
 1403: John Jainyil
 1409: John Mason, The Vicar of Ampthill
 1409: William Stewenys (Stephens)
 1409: Ralph Conquest
 1425: W. Gunwardy, The Bishop of Dunkeld
 1451: William Hoveden
 1453: John Freman
 1456: John Cras
 1457: John Dey
 1461: John Tapert
 1461: Thomas Dey
 1461: John Bowland
 1464: Henry Abraham
 1465: William Stanford
 1483: Thomas Yerburgh
 1489: Richard Wright
 1491: John Underhill
 1509: Thomas Hunne
 1510: Humphrey Gascoigne
 1515: William Frankelyn
 1524: Ralph Cooke
 1531: William Coven
 1536: Thomas Birde
 1542: John Oldestocke
 1549: William Tatchame
 1551: William Walker
 1557: John Holdstocke
from other sources:
 1589-1631: Thomas Archer (1554 - 1631), local antiquarian
 1632: Edward Martin (died 1662), dean of Ely
 1654: John Poynter (1600–1684), canon of Christ Church Oxford
 1656-1662: Samuel Fairclough (c. 1625 - 1691) ejected 1662 in favour of Edward Martin above (who then died)
 4 April 1725: Zachary Grey (1688 – 1766), and vicar of St Giles's and St Peter's in Cambridge
 1837-1873: Henry John Rose (1800 - 1873), theologian and antiquarian

In addition, two other people have been named as rector:
 Edward Woodley Bowling, named
 Rev. Birch
 Herbert W. Macklin

See also
Grade I listed buildings in Bedfordshire

References
 This article includes text incorporated from E.R. Kelly's "Kelly's directory of Bedfordshire, Hunts and Northamptonshire." (1885), a publication now in the public domain.

Church of England church buildings in Bedfordshire
Grade I listed churches in Bedfordshire
St John's College, Cambridge